Australia and the United States are close allies, maintaining a robust relationship underpinned by shared democratic values, common interests, and cultural affinities. Economic, academic, and people-to-people ties are vibrant and strong. At the governmental level, relations between Australia and the United States are formalized by the ANZUS and AUKUS treaties and the Australia–United States Free Trade Agreement. They were formally allied together in both World War I, World War II, the Korean War, the Vietnam War, the Gulf War, and the War on Terror, although they had disagreements at the Paris Peace Conference. Australia is a Major non-NATO ally of the United States.

Both the United States and Australia share some common ancestry and history (having both been British colonies). Both countries had native peoples who were at times dispossessed of their land by the process of colonization. Both states have also been part of a Western alliance of states in various wars. Together with three other Anglosphere countries, they comprise the Five Eyes espionage and intelligence alliance.

Independent foreign policy 

The political and economic changes wrought by the Great Depression and Second World War, and the adoption of the Statute of Westminster 1931, necessitated the establishment and expansion of Australian representation overseas, independent of the British Foreign & Commonwealth Office. Australia established its first overseas missions (outside London) in January 1940. The first accredited diplomat sent by Australia to any foreign country was Richard Gavin Gardiner Casey, appointed to Washington in January 1940.

The US Embassy opened in Canberra in 1943, constructed in a Georgian architectural style.

Military 

In 1908, Prime Minister Alfred Deakin invited the Great White Fleet to visit Australia during its circumnavigation of the world. The fleet stopped in Sydney, Melbourne and Albany. Deakin, a strong advocate for an independent Australian Navy, used the visit to raise the public's enthusiasm about a new navy.

The visit was significant in that it marked the first occasion that a non-Royal Navy fleet had visited Australian waters. Many saw the visit of the Great White Fleet as a major turning point in the creation of the Royal Australian Navy. Shortly after the visit, Australia ordered its first modern warships, a purchase that angered the British Admiralty.

The United States and Australia both fought in World War I with the Allied Powers. However, at the Paris Peace Conference they disagreed over the peace terms for the Central Powers. While the U.S. delegation under President Woodrow Wilson favored a more conciliatory approach in line with Wilson's Fourteen Points, the Australian delegation under Prime Minister Billy Hughes favored harsher terms such as those advocated by French Premier Georges Clemenceau.

Australia forcefully pressed for higher German reparations and Article 231 of the Treaty of Versailles against U.S. opposition. Although U.S. Secretary of State Robert Lansing had guaranteed German leaders that Germany would only be given reparations payments for damages it inflicted, Hughes tried to press for an expansive definition of German "aggression" so that the British Empire and Dominions, including Australia, could benefit. Hughes also opposed Wilson's plans to establish the League of Nations despite French and British support. Australia also demanded that it be allowed to annex German New Guinea as a direct colony rather than a League of Nations mandate, although on this point it was overruled when the United Kingdom and its other Dominions sided with the United States.

During World War II, US General Douglas MacArthur was appointed Supreme Commander of the Allied Forces in the South West Pacific Area, which included many Australian troops. After the fall of the Philippines MacArthur's headquarters were located in Brisbane until 1944 and Australian forces remained under MacArthur's overall command until the end of World War II. After the Guadalcanal Campaign, the 1st Marine Division was stationed in Melbourne, and Waltzing Matilda became the division's march.

ANZUS

After the war, the American presence in the southwest Pacific increased immensely, most notably in Japan and the Philippines. In view of the cooperation between the Allies during the war, the decreasing reliance of Australia and New Zealand on the United Kingdom, and America's desire to cement this post-war order in the Pacific, the ANZUS Treaty was signed by Australia, New Zealand and the United States in 1951. This full three-way military alliance replaced the ANZAC Pact that had been in place between Australia and New Zealand since 1944.

Australia, along with New Zealand, has been involved in most major American military endeavors since World War II including the Korean War, Vietnam War, Gulf War and the Iraq War—all without invocation of ANZUS.   The alliance has only been invoked once, for the invasion of Afghanistan after the September 11 attacks on the World Trade Center and The Pentagon.

Notably Australia, as a founding member of SEATO, directly supported the United States in the Vietnam War at a time when the United States faced widespread international condemnation from even many of its allies over the war. Australian Prime Minister Robert Menzies feared the expansion of communism into Asia-Pacific countries, such as Indonesia and Malaysia, if the communists won the war and a resurgence of isolationism if the United States lost. Under Menzies's successor Harold Holt support for the war waned due to strategic differences between the U.S. Armed Forces and the Australian Defence Force and the changing strategic situation in the region with the 1965 Indonesian coup d'état and founding of ASEAN. In 1967 Holt refused to provide a larger troop commitment after a visit from President Lyndon B. Johnson's advisors Clark Clifford and Maxwell Taylor. Australia's increasing hesitance to continue the war led to its de-escalation and eventually President Richard Nixon's Vietnamization policy.

War on Terror
Following the September 11 attacks, in which eleven Australian citizens were also killed, there was an enormous outpouring of sympathy from Australia for the United States. Prime Minister John Howard became one of President George W. Bush's strongest international supporters, and supported the United States in the invasion of Afghanistan in 2001 and the Iraq disarmament crisis in 2002–03. Howard, Defence Minister Robert Hill, and Chief of the Defense Force Peter Leahy agreed to participate in the U.S.-led invasion of Iraq through Operation Falconer in order to improve its relationship with the United States despite widespread domestic and international condemnation of the war.

In 2004 the Bush Administration "fast tracked" a free trade agreement with Australia. The Sydney Morning Herald called the deal a "reward" for Australia's contribution of troops to the Iraq invasion.

However, Australian Prime Minister Kevin Rudd indicated that the 550 Australian combat troops in Iraq would be removed by mid-2008. Despite this, there have been suggestions from the Australian government that might lead to an increase in numbers of Australian troops in Afghanistan to roughly 1,000.

In 2011, during US President Obama's trip to Australia, it was announced that United States Marine Corps and United States Air Force units will be rotated through Australian Defence Force bases in northern Australia to conduct training. This deployment was criticised by an editorial in the Chinese state-run newspaper People's Daily and Indonesia's foreign minister, but welcomed by Australia's Prime Minister. A poll by the independent Lowy Institute think tank showed that a majority (55%) of Australians approving of the marine deployment and 59% supporting the overall military alliance between the two countries.

In 2013, the US Air Force announced rotational deployments of fighter and tanker aircraft through Australia.

Political

Since 1985, there have been annual ministerial consultations between the two countries, known as AUSMIN. The venue of the meeting alternates between the two countries. It is attended by senior government ministers such as the Australian Minister for Foreign Affairs, Australian Minister for Defence, US Secretary of Defense and US Secretary of State.

In late July 2020, Australia's Foreign Minister, Marise Payne, and Defence Minister Linda Reynolds, flew to the US to attend the annual AUSMIN talks with US Secretary of State Mike Pompeo and Defense Secretary Mark Esper despite concerns about the coronavirus. The year's talks focused on growing tensions with China. In the joint statement following the meetings, the two countries expressed “deep concern” over issues including Hong Kong, Taiwan, the “repression of Uyghurs” in Xinjiang and China's maritime claims in the South China Sea, which are “not valid under international law”.

Australian tours by US presidents 
The first Australian visit by a serving United States president was that of Lyndon B. Johnson in 1966 to seek support for Australia's ongoing involvement in the Vietnam War. Australia had previously sent advisers and combat troops to Vietnam. In 1992, George H. W. Bush was the first of four US presidents to address a joint meeting of the Australian Parliament.

United States tours by Australian Prime Ministers

Kyoto Protocol 
Australia's Prime Minister, Kevin Rudd, ratified the Kyoto Protocol on 3 December 2007, leaving the United States and Canada as the last major industrial nations not to ratify the agreement. Australia's previous government, led by Liberal John Howard, refused to ratify the Kyoto Protocol citing, along with the United States, that it would "damage their economies".

Trump administration (2017–2021)

The first phone conversation between the United States President Donald Trump and Australian Prime Minister Malcolm Turnbull took place in February 2017 and lasted around 25 minutes. During the call, Trump disagreed with Turnbull on a deal that had been made during President Barack Obama's presidency. The agreement aims to take about 1,250 asylum seekers into the United States, who are currently located on Nauru and Manus Island by Australian authorities. The deal will involve a swap of the 1,250 refugees located on Nauru and Manus with several thousand refugees originating in Honduras, Guatemala, and other Central American nations. Though the details of the trade were not made transparent to the public, a public briefing announced the deal would be applied only to existing refugees and that they would be resettled in America in the coming year.
 
On Twitter, 2 February 2017, Trump tweeted that the refugee agreement was a "dumb deal". Notwithstanding the disagreement, Vice President Mike Pence, while on a visit to Australia in April 2017, stated the United States will abide by the deal. In August 2017, The Washington Post released the full transcript of the meeting. In it, President Trump described the refugee deal as "ridiculous", "rotten", and "stupid". The President, angered by the discussion about refugees, said "I have had it. I have been making these calls all day and this is the most unpleasant call all day. Putin was a pleasant call". As at 16 November 2018 about 300 refugees have been resettled from Nauru under the refugee swap deal, some of whom want to return to Nauru.

In a video released by Channel Nine on 14 June 2017, Turnbull is seen mocking Trump at the Midwinter Ball.

In response to the growing threat of North Korea developing nuclear intercontinental ballistic missiles, Prime Minister Turnbull, in August 2017, emphasized the alliance between Australia and the United States and his nation's commitment to aiding the United States with possible conflict stating, "So be very, very clear on that. If there's an attack on the US, the ANZUS Treaty would be invoked and Australia would come to the aid of the United States, as America would come to our aid if we were attacked."

In May 2018, the United States granted Australia a permanent exemption from the United States' worldwide 25% steel tariff, making Australia one of only four nations worldwide to be exempted. Several other countries generally considered to have close relationships with the United States, such as Canada, Mexico, and the European Union, did not receive permanent exemptions.

On 2 January 2019, Washington lawyer Arthur Culvahouse was confirmed US Ambassador to Australia, filling a post that had been vacant since John Berry left the post in September 2016.

Biden administration (2021–present)

AUKUS and purchase of American nuclear submarines

On September 15, 2021, the leaders of Australia, the UK and the US announced "AUKUS":a new security partnership in the Indo-Pacific, building on the longstanding alliance between the three to share intelligence, deepen cooperation and help Australia build nuclear-powered submarine capabilities as China's influence grows.

Although China was not specifically mentioned in the news announcements, critics interpreted it as a major blow to Australian-Chinese relationship, by firmly allying Australia with the United States in military terms in the region. For the first time the United States and Britain will share their top-secret technology for nuclear submarines, which have a far longer range and lethal value than diesel submarines. By making the deal, Canberra broke with Paris, canceling a deal to purchase less expensive, less effective French diesel submarines.  No nuclear weapons are involved, and the submarines will carry conventional weapons only.  Beijing reacted angrily. The Chinese Ministry of Foreign Affairs, told the press that the deal would:seriously damage regional peace and stability, exacerbate an arms race and harm international nuclear nonproliferation agreements....This is utterly irresponsible conduct.

Trade 

Trade between the United States and Australia is strong, as evidenced by the Australia–United States Free Trade Agreement. The United States is Australia's fourth largest export market and its second largest source of imports. The United States is also the largest investor in Australia while Australia is the fifth largest investor in the US.

Australia and the United States also provide significant competition for each other in several third-party exports such as wheat, uranium and wool and, more recently, in the information technology sector. Although the US has a sizable sheep population, American imports of lamb meat from Australia and New Zealand remain stronger than the domestic output.

Opinion polls
A 2020 poll by YouGov declared Australia as the most positively viewed foreign country by Americans, with 75% having a favorable opinion. It ranked behind only the United States itself, which had a 78% rating. In a 2022 poll by Australian think tank the Lowy Institute, the United States garnered a 65% positivity rating from Australians. In the poll, it ranked behind Tonga, France, Ukraine, Japan, the United Kingdom, Canada and New Zealand (who placed first with a rating of 86%). In the 2021 and 2020 versions of the poll, the United States garnered a rating of 62%. In 2015, the year before Donald Trump came into power, the United States had received a much higher rating of 73%.

According to a 2014 BBC World Service poll, 44 percent of Australians had a "mainly positive" view of the United States and 46 percent had a "mainly negative" view, for a net rating of −2 points. No similar survey was conducted to ascertain American perceptions of Australia. According to the 2012 US Global Leadership Report, 55% of Australians approve of US leadership, with 21% disapproving and 24% uncertain. In a more recent 2016 Pew Research poll, 60% of Australians approve of US leadership.

In 2017, a major poll conducted in Australia by the Lowy Institute showed that 77% believed an alliance with the US was important for security. However, the survey showed that 60% of Australians had developed an unfavorable view of the US as a result of President Donald Trump. The survey also showed that the US was no longer considered Australia's "best friend", a title now held by New Zealand.

A 2017 survey conducted by the Pew Research Center showed only 29% of Australians had confidence in the then US President Donald Trump, in contrast to the 87% who had confidence in his predecessor, Barack Obama. It also showed 70% of Australians had no confidence in President Trump. The annual Lowy Institute survey revealed that in 2018 only 55% of Australians believed that the US could act responsibly in the world. This was a drop from 83% in 2011 and a record low. The survey also revealed that 70% of Australians do not think that Trump could act responsibly, with only 30% believing otherwise.

Embassies 
 The US Embassy was the first embassy established in Canberra. In constructing it, the United States desired to show Australians something typically American while balancing this aesthetic with Canberra's natural environment.

Twin towns and sister cities
  Adelaide, South Australia and  Austin, Texas
  Bayside, Victoria and  Nazareth, Pennsylvania
  Bega Valley, New South Wales and  Littleton, Colorado
  Bland, New South Wales and  Boring, Oregon
  Blue Mountains, New South Wales and  Flagstaff, Arizona
  Cairns, Queensland and  Scottsdale, Arizona
  Canterbury-Bankstown, New South Wales and  Colorado Springs, Colorado
  Cockburn, Western Australia and  Mobile, Alabama
  Darwin, Northern Territory and  Anchorage, Alaska
  Glen Iris, Victoria and  Glendale, California
  Gold Coast, Queensland and  Fort Lauderdale, Florida
  Bendigo, Victoria and  Los Altos, California
  Shepparton, Victoria and  Novato, California
  Hawkesbury, New South Wales and  Temple City, California
  Lake Macquarie, New South Wales and  Round Rock, Texas
  Launceston, Tasmania and  Napa, California
  Lismore, New South Wales and  Eau Claire, Wisconsin
  Mackay, Queensland and  Kailua-Kona, Hawaii
  Melbourne, Victoria and  Boston, Massachusetts
  Mildura, Victoria and  Upland, California
  Northern Beaches, New South Wales and  Huntington Beach, California
  Orange, New South Wales and  Orange, California
  Perth, Western Australia and  Houston, Texas
  Perth, Western Australia and  San Diego, California
  Port Stephens, New South Wales and  Bellingham, Washington
  Sutherland, New South Wales and  Lakewood, Colorado
  Sydney, New South Wales and  Portland, Oregon
  Sydney, New South Wales and  San Francisco, California
  Tamworth, New South Wales and  Nashville, Tennessee
  Wyndham, Victoria and  Costa Mesa, California

Quotes
 "The United States is profoundly grateful for this relationship, for the affection and the warmth that has grown between our citizens. For many reasons our ties have grown. One of the most important is that we see in each other qualities that we prize and hope for in ourselves. We admire in each other the pioneering spirit that our forebears brought to the tasks of pushing back the frontiers and building nations."
– Bill Clinton during his November 1996 speech to Australian Parliament.

See also 

 Australian Americans
 American Australians
 Australia Week
 Australian–American Memorial
 Embassy of Australia, Washington, D.C.
 Embassy of the United States, Canberra
 Friends of Australia Congressional Caucus
 Quadrilateral Security Dialogue
 US/Australia Parliamentary Friendship Group
 
 

General:
 Foreign relations of Australia
 Foreign relations of the United States

References

Further reading
 Armstrong, Shiro. "The economic impact of the Australia–US free trade agreement." Australian Journal of International Affairs 69.5 (2015): 513–537. online
 Bisley, Nick. "‘An ally for all the years to come’: why Australia is not a conflicted US ally." Australian Journal of International Affairs 67.4 (2013): 403-418.
 Camilleri, Joseph A. The Australia-New Zealand-US Alliance: Regional Security in the Nuclear Age (Routledge, 2019).
 Cuthbertson, Ken. "Australian Americans." Gale Encyclopedia of Multicultural America, edited by Thomas Riggs, (3rd ed., vol. 1, Gale, 2014), pp. 179–188. online
 Fernandes, Clinton. What Uncle Sam Wants: US Foreign Policy Objectives in Australia and Beyond (Springer, 2019).
 Firth, Stewart. Australia in international politics: an introduction to Australian foreign policy (3rd ed. 2021). excerpt
 Kelton, Maryanne.  "More than an Ally"?: Contemporary Australia-US Relations (2008).
 McDonald, Scott D., and Andrew T. H. Tan, eds. The Future of the United States-Australia Alliance: Evolving Security Strategy in the Indo-Pacific (2020)  excerpt
 Mackerras, Colin. "China and the Australia-US relationship: A historical perspective." Asian survey 54.2 (2014): 223–246. online
 Moore, John Hammond, ed. Australians in America: 1876–1976 (University of Queensland Press, 1977).
 Paul, Erik. Australia in the US Empire: A Study in Political Realism (2019) excerpt
 Rimmer, Susan Harris. "Australia's trade diplomacy and the Trans-Pacific Partnership:‘you’ve got to row your own boat’." Australian Journal of International Affairs 70.6 (2016): 625-640.
 Siracusa, Joseph M., and David G. Coleman eds. Australia Looks to America: Australian–American Relations, since Pearl Harbor (Regina Books, 2006).
 Stuart, David. "American trade with the British colony of New South Wales, 1792–1816—A reappraisal." History Compass 18.12 (2020): e12641.
 Tidwell, Alan. "The role of ‘diplomatic lobbying’in shaping US foreign policy and its effects on the Australia–US relationship." Australian Journal of International Affairs 71.2 (2017): 184–200.
 Tow, William T. "President Trump and the Implications for the Australia–US Alliance and Australia's Role in Southeast Asia." Contemporary Southeast Asia 39.1 (2017): 50–57.

External links

 "Background Note: Australia" US Department of State. August 2006. 11 October 2006
 "Australia-United States Free Trade Agreement"  Australian Government. 2005. 28 October 2006
 History of Australia - United States relations
 CIA World Factbook
 Embassy of Australia in Washington D.C.
 Embassy of the United States in Canberra
 Free Trade Agreement
 Dynamics of the US trade with Australia from 2012 to 2017

 
United States
Bilateral relations of the United States